Haruna Abdullahi (born 30 December 1993), known professionally as DJ AB, is a Nigerian rapper, music producer, songwriter and performing artist.

Early life 
DJ AB was born in Kaduna State, Nigeria where he obtained his JSCE and SSCE from Federal Government College, Kaduna State, he is currently studying B.Sc. Quantity Survey at Ahmadu Bello University, Zaria Nigeria.

In 2020, DJ AB released a song titled "Da so samu ne" which earned him artistic recognition in Nigeria.

In 2021, DJ AB partnered with emPawa Africa, a talent incubator program that supports artists all over Africa.

Discography 

 Studio Songs

 Studio EP (Extended Playlist)

Awards and nominations

References

External links 
 

Nigerian musicians
Nigerian male rappers
Living people
1993 births
Nigerian music industry executives
Nigerian record producers
Nigerian songwriters
Nigerian hip hop musicians
People from Kaduna State
Ahmadu Bello University alumni